Dr. Prof.Safdar Ali Kiyani (20 June 1948 – 22 April 2008) was a Pakistani ecologist, botanist,  professor and the Pro-Vice-Chancellor of the University of Balochistan, which is located in Quetta, Pakistan.

Murder
Kiyani was shot and killed by a gunman riding a motorbike on 22 April 2008, while he was walking near his home in Quetta. He was 60 years old at the time of his murder. The Baloch Liberation Army, a Baloch separatist organisation, claimed responsibility for Kiyani's killing.

Burial ceremony
Kiyani was buried in the city of Jhelum in Punjab. The University of Balochistan closed for one day to mark Kiyani's murder. The Punjab University teachers' association also condemned Kiyani's killing and held a day of mourning.
His full name was Dr Safdar Ali Kayani and his date of birth was 20 June 1948, his religion was Islam. He did his Matriculation in March 1964 in Agriculture Group from Government High school, Renala Khurd, then Intermediate in 1967 from Sahiwal district in the premedical group, he did his graduated from Government College, Jehlum in August 1969. He then got his master's degree from Punjab University in 1971 in the field of Botany.

Education
He started his career in 1971 as a demonstrator of the botany department of Punjab University up to 1973.
then as a research officer in Punjab University, meanwhile he did his PhD in ecology in which he wrote his thesis on  "Some Ecological Studies on Soil and Vegetation of Termite Affected Areas of Pakistan" from University of the Punjab.

Career
In 1980 he came to Quetta and joined University of Balochistan as a lecturer and remained on the same post till 1981. In 1981, he was promoted to the seat of assistant professor and in 1984 to associate professor. Meanwhile, in 1984, he took the charge of chairman of the botany department, and then in 1998 he became the meritorious professor. Afterwards, he achieved the status of dean of the Faculty of Sciences and then became the dean of the Faculty of Biological Sciences. In 2000, he was promoted to dean of student affairs, and in 2005, he became a  pro-vice-chancellor of the University of Balochistan.

Family 
Kayani left a widow, one daughter and three sons as his successor. His eldest son, Dr Adnan Safdar Kayani, is currently working as principal scientific officer at Pakistan Atomic Energy Commission (PAEC), and his youngest son, Dr Umar Safdar Ali Kayan,i is a Ph.D in the field of innovation and technology management and is currently working as an associate professor in a private institution.

References 

Baloch Liberation; from whom? at WTF: What The Fork?

2008 deaths
Scientists from Lahore
People from Quetta
Pakistani ecologists
Punjabi academics
Pakistani murder victims
People murdered in Balochistan, Pakistan
Deaths by firearm in Balochistan, Pakistan
Pakistani botanists
University of the Punjab alumni
Academic staff of the University of Balochistan
Pakistani botanical writers
1948 births